Weirdo Magnet is a 1996 studio album by Buck 65, re-released by Warner Music Canada in 2002.

Track listing

A 2-disc promo for the album had titles for the track:

Disc 1:

"Throw II"- 1:26
"Shopping for Shoes"- 3:54
"Taster's Choice"- 3:11
"Cat Piss"- 3:12
"Thought So"- 3:57
"Boogie n' Frenzy"- 4:16
"Amber Valletta"- 2:18
"Chin Music '96"- 3:10
"Stranded Without Pants"- 1:27
"Beatles Break"- 4:06
"Company"- 1:23
"Who You Frontin' For?"- 3:53
"Maintenance"- 3:43
"Plus Signs and Positivity"- 2:57
"Urine Trouble"- 2:20
"Shalom Harlow"- :44
"Kiss My Ass"- 3:39
"Fuckin' Chicks, Huh?"- 2:53
"Your Pissin' Me Off"- 4:35
"Shout It Out"- 4:05

Disc 2:

"Come Home"- 1:17
"Year Zero"- 1:58
"You Know the Science"- 3:21
"Baron Karza"- 5:15
"In a Bad Way"- 3:02
"Wildlife, Pt. 1"- 2:38
"Chillwack"- 3:13
"PR221"- :36
"The Basement Show"- 3:35
"State of the Art"- 2:12
"Wildlife, Pt. 2"- 2:56
"Style #386"- 2:15
"Providence"- 3:13
"The Back of My Hand"- 1:27
"Male Model"- 3:32
"Wildlife, Pt. 3"- 3:37
"Speak of the Devil"- :37
"Swung at a Bad Pitch"- 4:49
"This is a Joke"- 2:31

Warner Release
"Track 01" - 2:10
"Track 02" - 1:44
"Track 03" - 2:15
"Track 04" - 2:59
"Track 05" - 3:28
"Track 06" - 2:55
"Track 07" - 2:52
"Track 08" - 1:12
"Track 09" - 2:02
"Track 10" - 1:01
"Track 11" - 1:52
"Track 12" - 2:16
"Track 13" - 1:16
"Track 14" - 2:03
"Track 15" - 4:35
"Track 16" - 1:47
"Track 17" - 2:33
"Track 18" - 1:10
"Track 19" - 3:34
"Track 20" - 0:54
"Track 21" - 3:27
"Track 22" - 0:54
"Track 23" - 2:11

Note: The CD release of the album is titled as above, however a review by Buck 65 references titles of some tracks, including "Track 10" as "The Zyzygy".

References

External links
 [ Weirdo Magnet album] as listed by Allmusic
 Buck 65's review on Buck65.com

1996 albums
Buck 65 albums